Firebolt Analytics is a data software company, operating globally. Its main product is a cloud data warehousing platform for data engineers. Firebolt was founded and headquartered in Tel Aviv, Israel.

Overview 
Firebolt Analytics was founded on January 1, 2019, by Eldad Farkash, developer of databases, and Saar Bitner, marketing strategist, who worked previously together in Sisense. Firebolt has developed a cloud data warehouse for quick analyzing of high volumes of information.

On December 9, 2020, it launched its data warehousing platform after raising $37 million in a Series A round of funding.

On June 24, 2021, Firebolt Analytics the Series B round was led by Dawn Capital and K5 Global and the company received $127 million. It became a unicorn according to Forbes Israel.

According to ZDNEet Mosha Pasumansky joined the company as the CTO.

In January 2022, Firebolt became a unicorn by completing a $100 million Series C financing round at a company valuation of $1.4 billion.

References 

Companies based in Tel Aviv
Companies of Israel